Roberto Repole (born 29 January 1967) is an Italian theologian of the Catholic Church who became archbishop of Turin and bishop of Susa in May 2022. A native of Turin and a priest of that archdiocese since 1992, he taught theology at the university level from 1996 to 2022 and headed the Italian Theological Association from 2011 to 2016.

Biography
Roberto Repole was born in the Givoletto district of Turin on 29 January 1967. His father was a municipal councilor in Druento. Both his parents were originally from Rapone in southern Italy. He earned his licentiate (1998) and doctorate (2001) in theology at the Pontifical Gregorian University.

He was ordained a priest on 13 June 1992 by Cardinal Giovanni Saldarini. He then served as parish vicar from 1992 to 1996, lecturer in systematic theology at the Theological Faculty of Turin and the Higher Institute of Religious Sciences in Turin from 1996 to 2022, canon of the Royal Church of Saint Lawrence from 2010 to 2022, president of the Italian Theological Association from 2011 to 2016, and rector of the Turin section of the Theological Faculty of Northern Italy from 2016 to 2022. He was also a member of the administrative board of the Holy See Agency for the Evaluation and Promotion of Quality in Ecclesiastical Universities and Faculties (AVEPRO) from 2016 to 2022.

His roles on behalf of the archdiocese of Turin have included: coordinator of university pastoral care and a member for five years of the Diocesan Ecumenical Commission. Until 2022 he worked with the Santa Maria della Stella parish in Druento, was the diocesan ecclesiastical assistant of the Ecclesial Movement for Cultural Commitment (MEIC), and a member of the priests council.

Repole has been identified by some commentators as a "boariniano," that is, the member of a group of theologically and politically liberal clerics influenced by Sergio Boarino, who served as the rector of the Turin seminary during the 1980s and 1990s.

To mark the fifth anniversary of Francis' pontificate, Repole served as editor of La Teologia di Papa Francesco, an 11-volume series of analyses by theologians. Pope emeritus Benedict XVI expressed surprise at the inclusion of theologian , who, according to Benedict, had viciously attacked his teaching authority as pope.

He has written extensively on church organization, synodality, and the priesthood. Of the theologian's role he once wrote: "Theology cannot afford the luxury of cryptic language. And to do this he has two paths to follow: always be of service to the concrete people of God and to their living faith and maintain a lively dialogue with the culture of the contemporary world." With Serena Noceti, he has edited a nine-volume series of commentaries on the principal documents of the Second Vatican Council, Commentario ai documenti del Vaticano II.

Episcopate
On 19 February 2022, Pope Francis appointed Repole both archbishop of Turin and bishop of Susa. The appointment was a surprise in that his name had not been mentioned in press speculation about candidates for the Turin post, and it was unusual in that someone named to head an archdiocese is almost always already a bishop. He is the first native of Turin to be named archbishop there since the appointment of Agostino Richelmy in 1897 and the first graduate of the Turin Faculty of Theology named archbishop. He was installed in Turin on 7 May when he received his episcopal consecration from his predecessor Archbishop Cesare Nosiglia, with co-consecrators Marco Arnolfo, archbishop of Vercelli, and Alfonso Badini Confalonieri, bishop emeritus of Susa. He chose as his episcopal motto  ("Christ gave himself for me"). He was installed in Susa on 8 May.

Selected writings
Books
His publications include:

Il pensiero umile. In ascolto della Rivelazione (Città Nuova, 2007)
Seme del Regno. Introduzione alla Chiesa e al suo mistero (Esperienze)
L'umiltà della Chiesa (Qiqajon, 2010)
Come stelle in terra. La Chiesa nell'epoca della secolarizzazione (Cittadella, 2012)
Dono (Rosenberg & Sellier, 2013)
La vita cristiana (Edizioni San Paolo, 2013)
Chiesa (Cittadella, 2015)
Il sogno di una Chiesa evangelica (Libreria Vaticana, 2017)
 The Dream of a Gospel-Inspired Church: Pope Francis' Ecclesiology (Coventry Press, 2019)
Il dono dell’annuncio. Ripensare la Chiesa e la sua missione (Edizioni San Paolo, 2021)

Essays

Notes

References

External links
 
 

Living people
1967 births
Clergy from Turin
Pontifical Gregorian University alumni
Roman Catholic theologians
 Bishops appointed by Pope Francis
Archbishops of Turin
Italian Roman Catholic archbishops